Dagashi Kashi is an anime series based on the manga series of the same name, written and illustrated by Kotoyama. The 12-episode anime adaptation aired from January to March  2016. It was produced at Feel, and was directed by Shigehito Takayanagi, who also handled the series composition together with Yasuko Kamo. Kanetoshi Kamimoto was in charge of character design, and Satoshi Motoyama was the series' sound director. A second season aired from January 12 to March 30, 2018, with Tezuka Productions taking over the series production, and Feel instead being credited for setting cooperation. While Motoyama returns as sound director, several other duties have been taken over by new staff: for the second season, Satoshi Kuwabara is in charge of direction, Mayumi Morita handles the series composition, and Nana Miura designs the characters.

Episodes

Dagashi Kashi (2016)

Dagashi Kashi 2 (2018)

Notes

References

External links
 

Dagashi Kashi